Henry Gardiner (1868 – 1922) was a Scottish footballer who played in the Football League for Bolton Wanderers.

References

1868 births
1922 deaths
Scottish footballers
Footballers from Kilmarnock
English Football League players
Scottish Football League players
Renton F.C. players
Rangers F.C. players
Bolton Wanderers F.C. players
English Football League representative players
Association football defenders
FA Cup Final players